The 12833 / 12834 Howrah–Ahmedabad Superfast Express is a Superfast Express train belonging to Indian Railways that runs between  and  in India.

It operates as train number 12834 from Howrah to Ahmedabad and as train number 12833 in the reverse direction.

It connect states of West Bengal, Odisha, Jharkhand, Chhattisgarh, Maharashtra and Gujarat.

Coaches

The 12834/33 Howrah–Ahmedabad Superfast Express presently has 2 AC 2 tier, 2 AC 3 tier, 11 Sleeper class, 4 General Unreserved coaches, 1 pantry car & 2 EoG cum luggage coach.

As with most train services in India, coach composition may be amended at the discretion of Indian Railways depending on demand.

Service

The 12834 Howrah–Ahmedabad Superfast Express covers the distance of 2087 kilometres in 37 hours 05 mins (56.28 km/hr) & in 37 hours 35 mins (55.53 km/hr) as 12833 Ahmedabad–Howrah Superfast Express.

As the average speed of the train is above 55 km/hr, as per Indian Railways rules, its fare includes a Superfast surcharge.

Schedule

12833 leaves Ahmedabad Junction daily at night 12:15 AM and reaches Howrah on 2nd day at afternoon 1:30 PM
12834 leaves Howrah daily at 11:55 PM and reaches Ahmedabad Junction on 3rd day at afternoon 1:35 PM

Routeing

Traction

It is hauled by a  / Vadodara Loco Shed based WAP-7 electric locomotive from end to end.

External links

References 

Rail transport in Howrah
Transport in Ahmedabad
Express trains in India
Rail transport in Gujarat
Rail transport in Maharashtra
Rail transport in Chhattisgarh
Rail transport in Odisha
Rail transport in Jharkhand
Rail transport in West Bengal